Georgi Zharkov (born 10 May 1976) is a Bulgarian former ski jumper. He competed at the 2002 Winter Olympics and the 2006 Winter Olympics.

References

External links
 

1976 births
Living people
Bulgarian male ski jumpers
Olympic ski jumpers of Bulgaria
Ski jumpers at the 2002 Winter Olympics
Ski jumpers at the 2006 Winter Olympics
People from Samokov
Sportspeople from Sofia Province